IntelliServ is a National Oilwell Varco brand that manufactures and sells a broadband networked drilling string system used to transmit downhole information to the surface in a drilling operation.

Background

The IntelliServ network is a broadband telemetry system that allows instant transmission of data between the surface and the measurement tools positioned in the drill string bottomhole assembly near the drill bit. The invention of IntelliServ technology began in 1997 with a project on hydraulic mud hammers sponsored by the company Novatek and the United States Department of Energy. The project addressed the need for instant transmission of downhole data (data acquired within the wellhole) through drill pipe, leading to Novatek’s beginning on a networked drill pipe development project.  In 2001, the National Energy Technology Laboratory (NETL) began providing funding for the drill pipe project and an additional drill pipe data transmission project.

Five years of Department of Energy and NETL-funded research resulted in the IntelliServ network and Intellipipe, a drill pipe with an embedded data cable. In 2005, Grant Prideco bought the IntelliServ technology and launched the first IntelliServ network. Grant Prideco was purchased by National Oilwell Varco (NOV) in 2008, and the NOV-IntelliServ joint venture was formed in 2009 with 55% National Oilwell Varco and 45% Schlumberger ownership.

The first commercial deployment of a drill string telemetry network occurred using IntelliServ’s product in Myanmar in December 2006.

Technology
The IntelliServ network components are embedded in drill string components, known as IntelliPipe, which transmit subsurface data at 57,000 bits per second. The IntelliServ network upgrade can raise the speed to one million bits per second. The two-way data communication between downhole Measurement while drilling (MWD) and Logging while drilling (LWD) measurement tools and the operators  at the surface allow the operators to command rotary-steering tools, or configure downhole tools such as the formation pressure testing tool or sonic tools.

The IntelliServ network includes measurement nodes along the full length of the drill string that allow operators to acquire data along the wellbore. The measurement nodes measure and transmit temperature and pressure data acquired along the drill string, which can improve well site efficiency and reduce risks associated with hole cleaning, such as pack offs. The transmission of information is not affected by the depth, formation resistivity, drilling fluid properties, or required flow of the well. Surface operating parameters can control items detected by the sensors, such as shock and vibration.

The networked drill pipe can transmit data acquired by most large service companies.  As of March 2012, the system has been deployed on 90 wells totaling more than 1 million feet of drilling.

Notable Partners
IntelliServ partners with the following companies and organizations:
Baker Hughes and Inteq since 2007    
Halliburton  
National Energy Technology Laboratory is a partner in the IntelliServ broadband network  
Schlumberger
Weatherford International

References

Geophysical imaging